In Christian eschatology, the Four Last Things or four last things of man are Death, Judgment, Heaven, and Hell, the four last stages of the soul in life and the afterlife. They are often commended as a collective topic for pious meditation; Saint Philip Neri wrote, "Beginners in religion ought to exercise themselves principally in meditation on the Four Last Things." Traditionally, the sermons preached on the four Sundays of Advent were on the Four Last Things.

The 1909 Catholic Encyclopedia states "The eschatological summary which speaks of the 'four last things' (death, judgment, heaven, and hell) is popular rather than scientific. For systematic treatment it is best to distinguish between (A) individual and (B) universal and cosmic eschatology, including under (A): (1) death; (2) the particular judgment; (3) heaven, or eternal happiness; (4) purgatory, or the intermediate state; (5) hell, or eternal punishment; and under (B): (6) the approach of the end of the world; (7) the resurrection of the body; (8) the general judgment; and (9) the final consummation of all things.". Pope John Paul II wrote in 1984 that the "judgment" component encompasses both particular judgment and general judgment.

Books
Numerous theologians and Christian apologists have written on the Four Last Things; published accounts include:

16th century and earlier
 The Four Last Things (1522) by Thomas More; unfinished (published posthumously).

17th century

 The Four Last Things: Death, Judgment, Hell, and Heaven (1631) by Robert Bolton; published posthumously in 1639
 The four last things: death, judgment, hell, heaven by Martin of Cochem
 Four Last Things (1649) by William Sheppard, whose preface supported the Rump Parliament against the Presbyterians
  ("A Sensuous Representation of the Four Last Things") (1675) by Angelus Silesius
 Four Last Things–Death, Judgment, Heaven, and Hell (1691) by William Bates

18th century
  ("Devout musings on the four last things") (1714) by John Morgan
 Thoughts upon the Four Last Things (1734) by Joseph Trapp
 Four discourses on the four last things (1751) by Thomas Greene

20th century
 The Four Last Things (1960) by Harry Williams
  (1947) by Reginald Garrigou-Lagrange.  Published in English as Life Everlasting: A Theological Treatise on the Four Last Things: Death, Judgement, Heaven, Hell
 The Last Things: Concerning Death, Purification After Death, Resurrection, Judgment, and Eternity (1965) by Romano Guardini

The four last things

Death
Martin of Cochem explains that "there are three principal reasons why all sensible people fear death so much: First, because the love of life, the dread of death is inherent in human nature. Secondly, because every rational being is well aware that death is bitter, and the separation of soul and body cannot take place without inexpressible suffering. Thirdly, because no one knows whither he will go after death, or how he will stand in the Day of Judgment."

Or as Alphonsus Liguori wrote in his meditations: "We must die: how awful is the decree! We must die. The sentence is passed: It is appointed for all men once to die. Heb. 9:27"

The Last Judgment
Of the final judgment, Alphonsus Liguori writes that, "the last day is called in Scripture a day of wrath and misery; and such it will be for all those unhappy beings who shall have died in mortal sin; for on that day their most secret crimes will be made manifest to the whole world, and themselves separated from the company of the saints, and condemned to the eternal prison of hell, where they will suffer all the agonies of ever dying yet always remaining alive."

Heaven
Of heaven, Richard Challoner in his famous work Think Well On't writes, " Consider, that if God's justice is so terrible in regard to his enemies, how much more will his mercy, his goodness, his bounty declare itself in favour of his friends! Mercy and goodness are his favourite attributes, in which he most delights: his tender mercies says the royal prophet, Ps. 144. are over all his works.

Hell
Luis de la Puente writes concerning The nature of hell: "Hell is a perpetual prison, full of fire and of innumerable and very terrible torments, to chastise perpetually such as die in mortal sin. Or, again, hell is an eternal state, wherein sinners, for the punishment of their sins, want all that good which they may desire for their content, and endure all kinds of evils which they may fear for their torment. So that in hell is joined together the privation of all that good which men enjoy in this life and angels in the other, and the presence of all those evils which afflict men in this life and the devils in the other."

Artworks
The Four Last Things are a common theme of artistic and literary works as well as theological works.

References

Further reading

External links

Christianity and death
Christian eschatology